Sofa Surfers  is a British documentary series for the BBC  by John Walsh of Walsh Bros Ltd. There are over 130,000 children living in the UK today without a permanent place they can call home. Sofa Surfers is a BBC documentary series which takes a look into the lives of four homeless children living in different types of temporary accommodation. This is thought to be the first children’s documentary dedicated to this subject. Using animation and rotoscoping techniques by the company White Balance, the series has been described by the Whittington Hospital, which features in the film, as a watershed moment in children’s documentaries in the UK. The series was part of the BBC's homeless season of programmes.

The film attempted to show the real lives of homelessness children through a week of observational documentaries aimed at an audience of 6–12 years old. Its approach was enabling the young and vulnerable contributors to speak candidly about their situation, and employed current animation techniques to bring those stories alive. Each episode featured testimony from children, as young as six, and showed their resilience, black humour and mature understanding of the incredibly difficult circumstances they were in. Walsh spoke on BBC News about challenges making the series.

Two episode we filmed at the Chester-based charity Save The Family. One episode here included an interview with Iain Duncan Smith MP, supporter of the charity.

Walsh made the acclaimed three part documentary series Headhunting The Homeless for BBC2 in 2003.

Episodes
There have been 22 screenings of the episodes from this series, below are the details for the first UK transmissions.

Awards
It was Rose d'Or nominated in 2010 was nominated for the Social Award at the Rose d'Or Awards.

The International Documentary Association listed Sofa Surfers in their notable awards round up.

Reception
This series received wide recognition for challenging perceptions around childhood homelessness. The Daily Mirror described it as "Shocking story of homeless family." It went on to say "this heart-breaking five-part BBC documentary series Sofa Surfers...explores child homelessness for other youngsters.” 

The Daily Post described it as a “touching tale of a homeless child who finds refuge at a Flintshire safe-haven.” Tim McLachlan, Save the Family chief executive, said: “We saw Sofa Surfers as an excellent opportunity to enlighten young people about homelessness and how it can touch anybody of any age.” 

The series was covered by The Guardian’s Louise Carpenter, who wrote “for every statistic, or non-statistic, there is a real child who is trying to cope. It is because of this that Billy-Jo and the children and three other families agreed to feature in a BBC five-part documentary series, Sofa Surfers, about child homelessness, to be aired on CBBC next week - part of a homelessness season on CBBC aimed at breaking down prejudices, especially among children themselves. The series explores the day-to-day reality; the children's hopes, their dreams, their disappointments. But, more than anything else, it shows their bravery, a heartbreaking acceptance of circumstances over which they have no control.”

References

External links

British documentary television series
2010 British television series debuts
BBC television documentaries
Homelessness in the United Kingdom
Social realism